Shoe Cove is a local service district in the Canadian province of Newfoundland and Labrador.

Geography 
Shoe Cove is in Newfoundland within Subdivision O of Division No. 8.

Government 
Shoe Cove is a local service district (LSD) that is governed by a committee responsible for the provision of certain services to the community. The chair of the LSD committee is Sandy Newbury.

See also 
List of communities in Newfoundland and Labrador
List of local service districts in Newfoundland and Labrador

References 

Local service districts in Newfoundland and Labrador